The Turkman gate demolition and firing was an infamous case of political oppression and police brutality during the Emergency when the police shot and killed people protesting against demolitions of their houses ordered by Indira Gandhi's government in 1976. An official account of the number of people killed at Turkman gate is not available and the media was not allowed to cover the riot and massacre. One local guide claimed that nine of his friends were killed by police. More than ten bulldozers razed unauthorized houses and police fired on those protesting slum clearance.

Background 
During the Emergency, Indira Gandhi's government, prompted by her son Sanjay, launched the demolition drive to cleanse Delhi of slums and force poor residents to leave Delhi and move to distant settlements. The residents of Turkman Gate, refused to move as they stayed there from Mughal period (this was an internal part of the walled city) and would have to commute every day paying heavy bus fares to reach the city to earn their living. They resisted the bulldozing of their houses. On 18 April 1976, the police opened fire on protesters killing several of them. The government, who had earlier imposed censorship, ordered the newspapers not to report the massacre. The Indian public learned of the killings through foreign media such as the BBC. It was later reported that protesters were run over by bulldozers, resulting in several deaths.

Total deaths
Shah Commission report recorded statements of police officers and one officer admitted that at least twenty civilians died from gunfire.

See also
 Shah Commission
 Operation Blue Star

References

Citations

Sources

External links 

 

The Emergency (India)
1976 in India
1970s in Delhi
Massacres in India
Police brutality in India
1976 murders in India